Guthani is a community development block and a revenue circle in Siwan district of the Indian state of Bihar, lying on the banks of river Chhoti Gandak. It is one out of 13 blocks of Siwan Subdivision. The headquarter of the block is at Guthani town (Nagar Panchayat Guthani). The block is divided into Ten Gram Panchayats (Rural Area) and one city council, Nagar Panchayat Guthani (urban area).
 

Gram Panchayats
Gram panchayats of Guthani block in Siwan Subdivision, Siwan district.

Balua
Barpalia
Belaur
Biswar
Chitakhal
Jataur
Parari
Sohagara
Sonahula
Tarawa khurd

See also
Nagar Panchayat Guthani (City council)
Siwan Subdivision
Administration in Bihar

References

Community development blocks in Siwan district